A bifora is a type of window divided vertically in two openings by a small column or a mullion or a pilaster; the openings are topped by arches, round or pointed. Sometimes the bifora is framed by a further arch; the space between the two arches may be decorated with a coat of arms or a small circular opening (oculus).

The bifora was used in Byzantine architecture, including Italian buildings such as the Basilica of Sant'Apollinare Nuovo,  in Ravenna.  Typical of the Romanesque and Gothic periods, in which it became an ornamental motif for windows and belfries, the bifora was also often used during the Renaissance period.  In Baroque architecture and Neoclassical architecture the bifora was largely forgotten, or replaced by elements like the three openings of the Venetian window.  It was also copied in the Moorish architecture in Spain, where it is called  (from Arabic ).

It returned in vogue in the nineteenth century in the period of eclecticism and rediscovery of the ancient styles in Gothic Revival and Romanesque Revival architecture.

Gallery

See also
Monofora
Trifora
Quadrifora
Polifora

References

Architectural elements
Windows